Mahaffey is a surname of Scottish origin, and is an Anglicisation of the Gaelic name Mac Dhuibhshithe. It is a sept of Clan Macfie in Scotland, but the clan originated in Ireland. There the name is found largely in County Donegal, Ulster.

People with the surname Mahaffey include: 
 Art Mahaffey (born 1938), American athlete
 Audley F. Mahaffey (1899–1982), American politician
 Fred K. Mahaffey (1934–1986), American military officer
 Jim Mahaffey (1936–2020), American bridge player
 John Mahaffey (born 1948), American golfer
 Maryann Mahaffey (1925–2006), American politician
 Matt Mahaffey (born 1973), American musician
 Mike Mahaffey (1967–2005), American musician
 Randolph Mahaffey (born 1945), American basketball player
 Roy Mahaffey (1904–1969), American baseball player
 Valerie Mahaffey (born 1953), Indonesian-American actress

See also
 Mahaffy, a variant of the surname

References